Lars Reck (born 16 February 1999) is a Dutch football player. He plays for Sporting Hasselt.

Club career
He made his Eerste Divisie debut for MVV Maastricht on 9 November 2018 in a game against FC Volendam, as a 66th-minute substitute for Joeri Schroyen.

Ahead of the 2019-20 season, Reck joined RKSV Minor. On 4 January 2020, Reck moved to Belgium and joined Second Amateur Division club Sporting Hasselt. In September 2020, he returned to the Netherlands and joined EHC Hoensbroek.

References

External links
 

1999 births
Footballers from Maastricht
Living people
Dutch footballers
Dutch expatriate footballers
Association football forwards
MVV Maastricht players
EHC Hoensbroek players
Eerste Divisie players
Dutch expatriate sportspeople in Belgium
Expatriate footballers in Belgium